Ocala Estates is an unincorporated community and census-designated place (CDP) in western Marion County, Florida, United States.

Ocala Estates was first listed as a CDP for the 2020 census, at which time it had a population of 2,991.

Demographics

References 

Census-designated places in Marion County, Florida
Census-designated places in Florida